Lipinia leptosoma, also known as the slender lipinia  or Pandanus skink, is a species of skink. It is endemic to Palau.

References

Lipinia
Reptiles of Palau
Endemic fauna of Palau
Reptiles described in 1958
Taxa named by Walter Creighton Brown
Taxa named by Herman Adair Fehlmann